Johan and Peewit is a Belgian comics series created by Peyo. Since its initial appearance in 1947 it has been published in 13 albums that appeared before the death of Peyo in 1992. Thereafter, a team of comic book creators from Studio Peyo continued to publish the stories.

The series is set in Medieval Europe and includes elements of sword-and-sorcery. Johan et Pirlouit provided the framework for the first appearances of The Smurfs.

Publication history
Initially titled simply Johan, the series first appeared in the newspaper La Dernière Heure in 1947 and then in Le Soir from 1950 until 1952. It began publication in the Franco-Belgian comics magazine Spirou on 11 September 1952 and the initially blond-haired hero became dark-haired.

In 1954, Johan was joined by Pirlouit, and the series took its final name. It was in Johan et Pirlouit, on 23 October 1958, that the first smurf appeared.

Peyo stated that Pirlouit was his favourite character, and Johan et Pirlouit was the only series on which he always did the drawings without the aid of the studio. Their adventures appeared regularly in Spirou in the 1950s and early 1960s, but the success of the Smurfs meant that they were much neglected afterwards, aside from a very short one-off adventure in 1977. However, following Peyo's death, other artists and writers have revived the series with 4 more albums between 1994 and 2001.

Synopsis
Set in the Middle Ages in an unnamed European kingdom, the series follows the adventures of Johan, a brave young page to the King, and Peewit, his faithful, if boastful and cheating, midget sidekick. Johan rides off in search of adventure with his trusty horse Bayard, while Peewit gallops sporadically, and grudgingly, behind on his goat, Biquette. The pair are driven by duty to their King and the courage to defend the underpowered. Struggles for power between deposed lords and usurping villains form the basis of many of the plots which also contain elements of detective fiction as the pair hunt down traitors and outlaws, as well as fantasy, with witches and sorcerers, giants, ghosts and, above all, the Smurfs.

The first few adventures did not feature Peewit. From his first appearance in 1947, Johan had a number of solo adventures and met Peewit in 1954, thus, in line with many other comic series of the time, giving Johan's earnest hero a comic relief sidekick similar to Tintin's Captain Haddock, Lucky Luke's Rantanplan, Asterix's Obelix, Spirou's Fantasio or Gil Jourdan's Libellule.

Characters 
Johan: servant of the King. Courageous and skilled with both a sword and a bow, this black-haired hero aspires to becoming a knight. He is the quintessential bold fighter, always ready to be in the thick of it, and a natural leader. Johan is quick to intervene whenever he sees an injustice being committed and will go all the way to rectify wrongs, ignoring Peewit's grumblings about the problems that they are going to face in the process. His name is pronounced "Yohahn".
Peewit: a blond, gluttonous dwarf, he lived in the forest neighboring the King's castle playing practical jokes on the people and stealing meats and apples before being hired as the court jester. He agreed, provided that he was not obliged to wear the jester's outfit, which he felt made him look like a "fool" (which is another term for jester). His name is pronounced "Peewee".Contrary to what he believes himself, Peewit is a terrible musician, though, unlike Cacofonix from the Asterix series, the other inhabitants of the castle cannot bring themselves to tell him how bad he is — though the King did once make a show of removing earplugs in Peewit's presence. His "music" has also been known to cause rain.Peewit is easily upset, especially when Johan volunteers him to go on another adventure but, being cunning and agile, he is quite capable of escaping from a tight corner and putting up a fight. When outwitting his enemies, he screams out his cry of triumph: "Peeeewiiiiit". In the Smurfs cartoon series, rather than being a random dwarf, he is the King's nephew, as he states in the episode The Sorcery Of Maltrochu, and is portrayed as a kid, younger than Johan.
Bayard: Johan's horse, He's his loyal steed and is always there to lay a hoof whenever Peewit is unable to help.
Biquette: Peewit's goat, who is endowed with a strong character. Her horn attack is extremely powerful. Her name is the French word for nanny goat.
The King: the unnamed monarch of the Kingdom. He is somewhat carefree and enjoys wine but is also firm and is loved by his subjects and vassals. He has a beautiful niece, but no direct descendants. He can be very keen to go on expeditions and battles — which can be difficult given his old age.
Homnibus: an enchanter whom the heroes often consult on matters of magic. He is also an alchemist and herbalist. It is he who first tells Johan and Peewit about the beings called the Smurfs.
Olivier: Homnibus' young servant.
Rachel: an old sorceress, who has a terrible reputation, but is actually very kind and helpful. She knows how to make many different potions, including a mixture called Wine of Giddiness.
Count Tremaine: ("Comte Tréville" in the original French) a skilled knight and brave warrior, he is a friend and role model to Johan.
Lady Barbera: Usually called "Dame Barbara" in the cartoon series; an old aristocratic woman who resides in the King's castle, always wearing a green dress. She has a reputation for being a gossip, as well as being somewhat prideful and stuck-up.
The Smurfs: appear in several stories as Johan and Peewit's allies. While the Smurfs have their own series, adventures with their two human friends remain part of the "Johan and Peewit" series. Papa Smurf's knowledge of magic is especially helpful.
Princess Savina: niece to the King. She is pretty but hates ladylike things and is an excellent marksman (she only features in the Smurfs cartoon series).
Gargamel: The main antagonist and sworn enemy of the Smurfs, Gargamel is an evil wizard with limited powers. Gargamel is absolutely obsessed with the Smurfs, and his main goal vacillates from trying to eat them to trying to capture them for use in a potion to make gold to simply getting revenge.
Azrael: Gargamel's pet cat.

Merchandising
While never as popular as the Smurfs, Johan and certainly Peewit enjoyed their share of fame and popularity as well, and consequently some merchandising was made. In 1959, a first Peewit figurine was made by Dupuis, followed a few years later by a Johan. In the 1970s, Bully and Schleich made Johan and Peewit figurines in their series of PVC Smurf figurines. Plush puppets were made as well.

In other media and comics
Originally a Johan and Peewit adventure, The Smurfs and the Magic Flute was adapted into an animated film in 1976 in Europe, with considerable success. It was re-released in 1983 in the wake of the success of the Smurfs cartoons from Hanna-Barbera, and enjoyed some success in the USA as well.
Johan and Peewit were also featured in some of the animated Smurf cartoons, being the main stars in many episodes. In France and other European countries, their TV cartoon adventures were treated as a separate series from that of the Smurfs, even though the latter feature heavily.
In the early 1980s, some records about their adventures were made in France and Italy, contributors including Cristina D'Avena.
Another Peyo series was Benoît Brisefer (best known in English as "Benny Breakiron") about a little boy with extraordinary strength. Benoît's adventures are set in modern times. In one episode a man strongly resembling Johan can be seen signing into a luxury hotel near a film studio — he even wears a brown jacket and red trousers similar to Johan's; in another, a newspaper indicates the announcement of a film called Johan: The Return II with a photo of Johan next to it, and Biquette makes a cameo appearance in the same volume.
When the Smurfs got their own series, Johan and Peewit did not feature. However, they did appear in a 2008 Smurf adventure called Les schtroumpfeurs de flûte (French: "The Flute Smurfers"). This story, published to mark the 50th anniversary of the first appearance of the Smurfs, is a prequel to La flûte à six schtroumpfs (published in English as "The Smurfs and the Magic Flute") and tells how the Smurfs first deliver the flute which was to be the basis of the 1958 story. Johan and Peewit help out a human friend of the Smurfs, but do not actually get to meet the little blue elves themselves.

Stories and English translations
Few of Johan and Peewit's adventures have been published in English: La Flûte à six Schtroumpfs as The Smurfs and the Magic Flute (Hodder and Stoughton UK, 1979, Random House USA, 1983 and Papercutz USA, 2010), La guerre des sept fontaines as The War of the Seven Springs (Papercutz USA, 2013), and La Flèche noire under the title The Black Arrow (Fantasy Flight Publishing USA, 1995).

Below is a list of the French titles, their year of publication, an English translation of the titles and a brief description.

The first 13 albums were published by Dupuis; those that came afterwards were published by Le Lombard.

As well as Spirou magazine, some of the shorter stories, like Sortilèges au château, were published in Risque-Tout (French for "Daredevil") which came from the same publishers.

Johan's adventures published in newspapers prior to his appearing in Spirou are not included.

References

Sources

 Johan et Pirlouit publications in Spirou  BDoubliées

External links
Johan and Peewit Dupuis Publishing 

1947 comics debuts
2001 comics endings
Adventure comics
Animated duos
Belgian comics adapted into films
Belgian comic strips
Comics adapted into animated films
Comics adapted into animated series
Comics adapted into television series
Comics by Peyo
Comics characters introduced in 1947
Comics set in the Middle Ages
Comic strip duos
Dupuis titles
Fictional Belgian people
Fictional duos
Fictional knights
Humor comics
Lombard Editions titles
Male characters in comics
Peyo characters
Television duos
The Smurfs characters